Eucatops is a genus of small carrion beetles in the family Leiodidae.

Species
These species belong to the genus Eucatops:

 Eucatops andersoni
 Eucatops antennatus
 Eucatops apterus
 Eucatops brevistylis
 Eucatops crassicornis
 Eucatops curtus
 Eucatops curvipes
 Eucatops dentatus
 Eucatops equatorianus
 Eucatops femoratus
 Eucatops filifer
 Eucatops formicetorum
 Eucatops giganteus
 Eucatops glabricollis
 Eucatops globosus
 Eucatops granuliformis
 Eucatops grouvellei
 Eucatops haemorrhoidalis
 Eucatops incognitus
 Eucatops inermis
 Eucatops magnus
 Eucatops mexicanus
 Eucatops montanus
 Eucatops oblongus
 Eucatops obtusus
 Eucatops onorei
 Eucatops osa
 Eucatops ovalis
 Eucatops paramontanus
 Eucatops pecki
 Eucatops rossii
 Eucatops rufescens
 Eucatops solisi
 Eucatops spiralis
 Eucatops tenuisaccus
 Eucatops troglodytes

References

Further reading

 

Leiodidae